Gulam Rasool Balyawi (born May 21, 1969 Patna ) a politician from Janata Dal (United) party, was a Member of the Parliament of India representing Bihar in the Rajya Sabha, the upper house of the Parliament.

He was elected in bye-elections held in 2014.
He was born in Village Semeri Rampur Ballia Uttar Pradesh.

Father's Name Haji Sagir Ahmad  was a farmer. He was born in Semeri Rampur Ballia Uttar Pradesh.

Mr Balyawi is the founder of Non Profit organization known sa Qaumi Ittehad Morcha.

His mother Hajjan Ajmari Khatoon was born in village Basarikhpur Ballia Uttar Pradesh.

References

Janata Dal (United) politicians
1969 births
Living people
Rajya Sabha members from Bihar
Members of the Bihar Legislative Council